The 2016 PCBL Chairman's Cup was the second and the last conference of the inaugural season of the Pilipinas Commercial Basketball League and the first and the last offering of PCBL for the year 2016. It was opened on March 6, 2016 at the Malolos Sports and Convention Center in Malolos, Bulacan. The PCBL games will be televised on a delayed basis on AksyonTV.

On May 27, 2016,  the 2016 PCBL Chairman's Cup championship was awarded to Jumbo Plastic Linoleum Giants setting the first record for back to back championship wins for the Pilipinas Commercial Basketball League, after beating the heavily star-studded team Mighty Sports 80-68 on Game 3. Jeff Viernes also was named as the Finals MVP averaging 22.7 points per game.

Developments
The Chairman's Cup will be the first conference of the PCBL under new commissioner Joel Banal, who replaced Ato Batolato. The PCBL also welcomed two new teams in the fledgling league, the SCTEX Road Warriors to be led by former PBA players Ervin Sotto, Ford Arao and Borgie Hermida, and Mighty Sports, bannered by former UAAP men's basketball MVP Kiefer Ravena and retired PBA player Ty Tang.

The SCTEX, under the ownership of Manila North Tollways Corporation, is also the reigning champion of the men's basketball competition in the 2016 MVP Olympics, after beating Mediaquest team, 90–80 in a one-game finals match on March 4, 2016 at the Meralco gym. PCBL will be the first major league of the Mighty Sports franchise to carry their own brand, after their appearances in small-time basketball tournaments such as Republica Cup held in Malolos, Bulacan where they won a championship.

Returning teams including Jumbo Plastic Linoleum Giants, the 2015 PCBL Founder's Cup champion., Sta. Lucia, Euro-Med, Foton and Supremo Lex-Our Lady of Fatima University. The team will also use imports for the conference. Notable imports which will be seen in the Champion's Cup are Bright Akhutie playing for Mighty Sports and Allwell Oraeme playing for Jumbo Plastic.

Format
The tournament format was observed during the conference as it follows: 
The elimination round will be a double round-robin classification. 
At the end of elimination round, the top 6 teams will advance to the playoffs, while the 7th placer team is eliminated. 
The 2 teams with the best record will go outright semifinals. 
The next 4 teams will undergo in the best-of-three quarterfinal round. 
Semifinals: (best-of-3 series)
SF1: #1 vs. QF1 winner 
SF2: #2 vs. QF2 winner
Third-place playoff: 
SF1 vs. SF2 losers
Finals: (best-of-3 series) 
F1: SF1 vs SF2 winner

Venues

Eliminations

Standings
These are the team standings at the end of elimination round:

Schedule

Results

Playoffs

Bracket

Quarterfinals

Euro-Med vs. Foton

Biyaheng SCTEX vs. Sta. Lucia

Semifinals
This round is in a best-of-three playoff. The first team who wins 2 games advances to the finals and the losing team will go for the third-place playoff.

Mighty Sports vs. Euro-Med

Jumbo Plastic vs. Sta. Lucia series

Game 1

Game 2

Game 3

Third-place playoff

Finals

Game 1

Game 2

Game 3 

This is the first playoff (finals) meeting between the Mighty Sports and the Giants.

Awards

References

Chairman's Cup
PCBL